Mary Hatwood Futrell (born 1940) is an American educator.

Early life
Futrell was born on 24 May 1940 in Altavista, Virginia. She received her early education from George Washington High School. She completed her BA from Virginia State College in 1962 and MA from George Washington University in 1968. Later, she attended the University of Maryland, University of Virginia, and Virginia Polytechnic Institute for further education.

Career
Futrell started her career as a high school teacher and worked in Alexandria, Virginia between 1963 and 1980.

In 1983, Futrell joined the National Education Association as secretary–treasurer and later elected as its president in 1983, and continued to serve the organization until 1989. During her tenure, she worked to lower the student dropout rate by increasing the use of technology in the classroom and supporting families of children. The National Education Association later established an award in her honor.

In 1992, Futrell joined George Washington University as a faculty member and later became the dean of the Graduate School of Education and Human Development.

Awards
 American Black Achievement Award, 1984

References

1940 births
American educators
Living people